Antalla is a village in western Eritrea. It is situated approximately 50 km north-west of Barentu.

Location
The town is located in the Haykota District, lying 9.7 miles from the district capital of Haykota in the Gash-Barka region.

Nearby towns and villages Elit (12.7 nm), Algheden (13.3 nm), Ad Casub (8.9 nm), Gonye (9.0 nm) and Markaughe (10.0 nm).

Villages in Eritrea